The chestnut-winged hookbill (Ancistrops strigilatus) is a species of bird in the ovenbird family Furnariidae. It is the only member of the genus Ancistrops.

Within the ovenbird family, the chestnut-winged hookbill is most closely related to the foliage-gleaners in the genus Dendroma.

It is found in Bolivia, Brazil, Colombia, Ecuador, and Peru. Its natural habitat is subtropical or tropical moist lowland forest.

References

chestnut-winged hookbill
Birds of the Amazon Basin
Birds of the Colombian Amazon
Birds of the Ecuadorian Amazon
Birds of the Peruvian Amazon
chestnut-winged hookbill
Taxonomy articles created by Polbot